Michael Burrows, FRS (born 1963) is a British computer scientist and the creator of the Burrows–Wheeler transform, currently working for Google. Born in Britain, as of 2018 he lives in the United States, although he remains a British citizen.

Education
Burrows studied Electronic Engineering with Computer Science at University College London and then completed his PhD in the Computer Laboratory, University of Cambridge, where he was a postgraduate student of Churchill College, Cambridge supervised by David Wheeler.

Career
Upon leaving Cambridge, he moved to USA and worked at the Systems Research Center (SRC) at Digital Equipment Corporation (DEC) where, with Louis Monier, he was one of the two main creators of AltaVista.

Following Compaq's acquisition of DEC, Burrows worked briefly for Microsoft preventing spamming. Shortly thereafter he went to Google.

After his early work at the University of Cambridge, where he researched microkernels and basic matters of security, he went on to enlarge upon that work as systems were deployed at large scale on the Internet.

During his employment at Google, Burrows has studied concurrency & synchronisation and programming in the large – especially with respect to the C++ language. He designed the Chubby lock service for coordination between server nodes in large distributed systems.

Awards and honours
Burrows was elected a Fellow of the Royal Society in 2013. His nomination reads:

Burrows received the SIGOPS Mark Weiser Award in 2003.

He received the IET Achievement Medal (Computer Engineering) in 2019.

References

1963 births
British computer scientists
Google employees
Fellows of the Royal Society
Living people
Alumni of University College London
Alumni of Churchill College, Cambridge
Computer security academics
Digital Equipment Corporation people